Private First Class David M. Gonzales (June 9, 1923 – April 25, 1945) was a United States Army soldier who posthumously received the Medal of Honor —  the United States' highest military decoration – for his actions during World War II.  On April 25, 1945, at age 21, PFC Gonzales was killed in action in the Philippines while, in the face of enemy machine gun fire, digging out fellow soldiers who had been buried in a bomb explosion.

Early years
Gonzales, a Mexican-American, was a semi-skilled machine shop worker in Los Angeles when he joined the U.S. Army in San Pedro, California in March 1944.

World War II

On April 25, 1945, Gonzales' company found itself engaged in combat against Japanese forces at Villa Verde Trail on Luzon island in the Philippines. The Army Air Corps was using a tactic called "skip bombing" and were fusing the bombs for delayed action detonation to destroy the labyrinth of Japanese caves and tunnels in the northern Luzon campaign. This fusing allowed the bomb to bury itself deeply into the ground prior to detonation. This event trapped five American soldiers in their standing foxholes.

On December 8, 1945, President Harry S. Truman, posthumously awarded the Medal of Honor to Gonzales, presenting the medal to his surviving family. On February 2, 1949, Gonzales' body arrived in a funeral train to San Fernando, California where he was buried.

Medal of Honor citation

After the war

In 1999, David Gonzales, Jr. and his wife Bea attended a ceremony for war heroes in Santa Ana, California. There, they discovered that the picture the Army was sending out to military ceremonies was not of his father, but of someone else. Gonzales Jr. wrote to the Army in Washington, D.C. to tell them of their mistake, but did not receive a response. He then wrote to Congressman Howard Berman, who in turn referred the letter to his aide Fred Flores.  Flores, who was also from Pacoima, California, immediately called Pentagon officials and had them correct the mistake. However, Flores found out that the family had only been presented with a Medal of Honor and a duplicate Purple Heart — the original one was stolen – and he realized that Gonzales had earned many other medals.
During a November 7, 2002, ceremony at Los Angeles Mission College, Congressman Berman presented David Gonzales, Jr. the following medals earned by his father: the Bronze Star, the Purple Heart, the World War II Victory Medal, the Asiatic-Pacific Campaign Medal with two Bronze Service Stars, the Philippine Liberation Medal, the World War II Honorable Service Lapel Button, the Combat Infantryman Badge, and the Expert Rifle Badge. Finally, he presented the Gold Star Lapel Button, which identifies the next of kin of members of the military who lost their lives while engaged in action.

The photo of a soldier who was not Gonzales, but identified as that of the medal winner, had been erroneously displayed in the Pentagon's Hall of Heroes. This was removed and replaced with a correct one of Gonzales after the renovations of the Pentagon – made necessary by the 9/11 attack – were completed on March 31, 2003.

Reunion between the Gonzales and Kouts families

On March 20, 2007, Maribeth Kouts, daughter of William Kouts posted the following message in Wikipedia:
 
"my father, William Kouts, was the soldier David M. Gonzales was digging out when he was shot and killed by sniper fire. My Dad is 85 and in ill health and we want to get into contact with the Gonzales family before Dad's passing so that Dad can tell David Jr. of his father's heroics firsthand.Mbkouts"

Tony Santiago responded to the message and told Maribeth that he would try to help her in their quest. Santiago sent e-mails to Congressman Howard Berman and telephoned every David Gonzales in the Los Angeles area without any luck. He then placed a message in "Somos Primos", a Hispanic heritage cultural magazine, and on April 11, 2007, Santiago made contact with Ernestine Gonzales, cousin of David Gonzales Jr. and, as a result, both families met in the Atlanta suburb of Powder Springs, Georgia for the first time on May 24, 2007. The event brought closure to over 60 years of searching for the relatives of David M. Gonzales on behalf of William W. Kouts. Said Beatrice Gonzales, David's daughter-in-law, "We feel so much peace because David's father died to save a very good man who lived a good life." We owe so much to Mr. Santiago," said Maribeth Kouts.

In Memoriam
In honor of David M. Gonzales, Pacoima Park in Los Angeles County, California was renamed David M. Gonzales/Pacoima Recreational Center. The local Army recruiting station there also carries his name, as does a county Probation Department camp in Malibu.

In November 2015, the interchange between the 5 and 118 freeways in Los Angeles' San Fernando Valley was renamed the David M. Gonzales Memorial Interchange.

Awards and recognitions
Among Pvt. David M. Gonzales' decorations and medals were the following:

See also

List of Medal of Honor recipients for World War II
List of Hispanic Medal of Honor recipients
Hispanic Americans in World War II
Ysmael R. Villegas, also a 32d Infantry Division Medal of Honor recipient

Notes

External links

United States Army soldiers
United States Army personnel killed in World War II
United States Army Medal of Honor recipients
American people of Mexican descent
Military personnel from California
1923 births
1945 deaths
World War II recipients of the Medal of Honor
People from Pacoima, Los Angeles